Leslie Abrams Gardner (née Leslie Joyce Abrams; born December 6, 1974) is a U.S. District Judge of the United States District Court for the Middle District of Georgia. Prior to being appointed to the bench, she was an Assistant United States Attorney.

Biography

Gardner is the daughter of the Reverend Carolyn and the Reverend Robert Abrams, originally of Hattiesburg, Mississippi. She was one of six children. Her sister Stacey Abrams is the former House Minority Leader in the Georgia General Assembly, and the Democratic nominee for governor in the 2018 Georgia gubernatorial election and 2022 Georgia gubernatorial election.

Gardner received a Bachelor of Arts degree in 1997 from Brown University. She received a Juris Doctor in 2002 from Yale Law School. She began her career serving as a law clerk for Judge Marvin J. Garbis of the U.S. District Court for the District of Maryland. She served as an associate at the law firm of Skadden, Arps, Slate, Meagher and Flom LLP, from 2003 to 2006 and again from 2007 to 2010. She served as an associate at the law firm of Kilpatrick Stockton LLP, from 2006 to 2007. From 2010 to 2014, she served as an Assistant U.S. Attorney in the Northern District of Georgia.

Federal judicial service

On March 11, 2014, President Barack Obama nominated Gardner to serve as a U.S. District Judge for the Middle District of Georgia, to the seat being vacated by Judge W. Louis Sands, who assumed senior status on April 12, 2014. She received a hearing before the full panel of the Senate Judiciary Committee on May 13, 2014. On June 19, 2014, her nomination was reported out of committee by voice vote. On November 12, 2014, Senate Majority Leader Harry Reid filed for cloture on her nomination. On Monday, November 17, 2014 cloture was invoked by a 68–28 vote. On Tuesday, November 18, 2014 the Senate confirmed her nomination by a 100–0 vote. She received her judicial commission on November 20, 2014.

See also 
 Joe Biden Supreme Court candidates
 List of African-American federal judges
 List of African-American jurists

References

External links

1974 births
21st-century American judges
21st-century American women judges
African-American judges
African-American women lawyers
African-American lawyers
American women lawyers
American lawyers
Assistant United States Attorneys
Brown University alumni
Georgia (U.S. state) lawyers
Judges of the United States District Court for the Middle District of Georgia
Lawyers from Madison, Wisconsin
Living people
United States district court judges appointed by Barack Obama
Yale Law School alumni